Marcus Pearl is an Australian local government politician and businessman. He is a councillor of the City of Port Phillip and was its mayor, from 2021 to 2022. He was first elected to Port Phillip in 2016.

References

City of Port Phillip
Date of birth missing (living people)
Year of birth missing (living people)
21st-century Australian politicians
Victoria (Australia) local councillors
Living people